Azerbaijan competed at the 2004 Summer Paralympics in Athens, Greece. Two powerlifters failed drug tests for steroids in initial drug tests on 18 September 2004 and were banned for life from the Paralympics having both failed tests in previous championships. Sara Abbasova competed in the women's -82.5 kg category and had her first violation at the 2001 powerlifting championships in Hungary. Gunduz Ismayilov who had set a world record and won a gold medal in Men's -90 kg competition at the 2000 Summer Paralympics was stripped of it and had his record nullified after testing positive for nandrolone.

Medalists

Sports

Athletics

Men's track

Men's field

Judo

Men

Powerlifting

Men

Shooting

Women

See also
Azerbaijan at the Paralympics
Azerbaijan at the 2004 Summer Olympics

References

External links
 Paralympics 2004
Athens 2004 Press Release, International Paralympic Committee

Nations at the 2004 Summer Paralympics
2004
Paralympics